Pô Airport  is a public use airport located in northwest Pô, Nahouri, Burkina Faso.

See also
List of airports in Burkina Faso

References

External links 
 Airport record for Pô Airport at Landings.com

Airports in Burkina Faso
Nahouri Province